Christian Langlois is a Canadian film director based in Montreal, Quebec. He has directed several short films, video content, series, commercials, music videos  and media installation. He studied at Université du Québec à Montréal in communications programs  photography, cinema, art video and new digital media.  He published several articles about the role of digital technologies and video in the development of visual and performing arts.

After graduate studies in new media and digital art, he began as a visual and electronic artist, mainly in video art, video installation, short films, and happenings. His works are shown in contemporary art galleries, museums, film festivals and cultural events network, in Europe, Asia, USA. He has been a guest of Danae Art Foundation in France and a guest of French Cultural Minister and the Mayor of the City of Blois: Mr. Jack Lang. He presents in Blois, France a video installation: Le sale à manger. A video quartet dedicated to gastronomy art.

Early in his career as a motion designer, experimental video director and Creative director he collaborates to foundation of a visual department at MusiquePlus, a Québécois MTV (French-Canadian musical television channel), devoted to the diffusion of musical videos and edgy pop culture programs. The program was a kind of research laboratory of televisual and videographic experimentation, which changed the Canadian televisual framework and which receives the recognition of its pars and the public: Prix Gémeaux, Promax/BDA, a reference as regards motion design, computer art, computer animation and film experimentation mix media.

In the late 1990s, Christian Langlois focused an advertising career as an advertising film director for majors and prestigious brands in fashion, telecom, teen culture, extreme sports... such a clients as 3M, Nivea, Nestlé, Côte d'Or, Danone, AT&T, Verizon, T-Mobile, Bell Communications, Yellow Pages, Vidéotron, Telus, Mastercard, Air Canada, Bombardier, Toyota, General Motors, Budweiser, Black Label, Molson Brewery, General Mils, Zip, Bayer, Health Canada, RBK, CCM, Cirque du Soleil, Telefilm Canada, ABC, CBS, Fox, CBC, SRC, TVA, Astral Media, TV5, MTV, MusiquePlus and enRoute. He has collaborated worldwide with many production houses companies Propaganda Films (in Los Angeles), Cinelande, Jet Film, Objectif, La Fabrique d'images, Radke Films, Partners films, The Garden (Toronto), Velocity (Cap Town) Milk & Honey (Praha), AOI Japan), Satellite My Love (Paris), Les Enfants, Industry Films, FH studio. In 2013 he directed a clever interactive viral branded content for OB A Personal Apology, This viral was a huge success, more over 47 million views and won 22 Worldwide awards.

Christian Langlois has been recognized at numerous major events and a multi-award winner: Cannes Lion, Clio, London International Awards, SXSW Awards, TED, Bessies, Webby Awards, Canadian Marketing Awards, Canadian Innovation Awards, Promax BDA Awards, David Ogilvy Awards, Applied Arts Awards, Summit International Awards, Rx Club Awards, Gemeaux, Vision Liberté, Pixel, Coq of Publicity Club of Montreal

Today he is an active Commercial Film Director for several production houses and also a Creative Direction consultant specializing in visual identity, branding for entertainment and television industry for Mémoire Liquide rep by The Format Peoplein Los Angeles. He collaborates with many broadcasters in Asia, Middle East, Europe and America, to do the complete rebranding of TV channels to opening credits sequence for a specific series and movies: Versailles, the series (Canal +, BBC2, Ovation, Netflix) Acceptable Risk, (RTI, Sundance Channel)... He creates with success on multi-visual languages of advertising, viral video, design, motion design, immersive, interactive, electronic art. Now he develops some feature films, TV series projects and special interactive and immersive content projects.

Videography 
 Sur la Corde Raide, National Film Board of Canada, (Opening and broadcast design)
Voyce, Summer Lust, (Musical video)
Rosenfeld, On the Front Lines, National Film Board of Canada, (Opening and broadcast design)
OB - A Personal Apology OB - Tampons, (Interactive Musical video) 47 million views, 22 awards
Michael Mooney, Open your eyes, (Interactive Musical video)
La Voix, cet otage merveilleux (25 shorts film)
Jorane, Dit-elle, (Musical video)
Rudy Caya, Mourrir de rire (Musical video)
Jean-Pierre Ferland, (Musical video)
Virtuel (Video installation)
Le sale à manger  (Video installation 20 short films)
La caverne d'Érika (Short film)
Station (Documentary about contemporary art)
14 Stations (Documentary about contemporary art)
Si tu es sage on ira voir la guerre (Short film)

Television 
NBC - NFL Sunday Night Football, 2019 TV opening sequence, NBC Networks and NFL, Rodeo FX
Hot Wire, 2019 documentary Opening sequence and Creative direction, NFB, National Film Board of Canada
TVA 2016, 2017, 2018, 2019 TV Launching promos, Group TVA, Quebecor Media
Freelancer on the Front Lines 2016 documentary Opening sequence and Creative direction, NFB, National Film Board of Canada
Acceptable Risk, TV series, RTI Ireland, Sundance Channel, Los Angeles (Opening and broadcast design)
Versailles, TV series, Canal+. Capa Drama, Incendo, Paris, (Opening and broadcast design)
Nouvelle Adresse, TV series, Ici Radio Canada télé, (Opening and broadcast design)
TVA 2013, 2014 and 2015 TV Branding and visual identity, Idents and promo graphic kit, Group TVA, Quebecor Media
MongolTV, TV Branding and visual identity, 20 idents, Group Gatsurt, Oulanbator, Mongolia
Moi&Cie TV Branding and visual identity, 10 idents  Group TVA, Quebecor Media
Mlle, TV Branding and visual identity, 10 idents, Group TVA, Quebecor Media
Mauvais Karma, TV series, Ici Radio Canada télé, (Opening and broadcast design)
Yoopa, TVA group, Sid Lee, (Animation for TV Ids and broadcast design)
Zed, Artv, CBC, Tokyo Disney, Cirque du Soleil, (Manga animation, opening and broadcast design)
Sophie, ABC-CBC, (Opening and broadcast design)
Rumeurs, SRC, (Opening and broadcast design)
Tupperware, Bowl of success, CBC,(Opening and broadcast design)
Les Francs Tireurs, Télé Quebec (Opening and broadcast design)
Musicographie, TVA -Musimax (Opening and broadcast design)
Buzzé, MusiquePlus (Opening and broadcast design)
Mamuz, MusiquePlus (Opening and broadcast design)
Electrochoc, MusiquePlus (Opening and broadcast design)
Perfecto Mode, SRC (Opening and broadcast design)
Mamuz, MusiquePlus (Opening and broadcast design)
Chic Planète, Musimax (Opening and broadcast design)
D., TV5 (Opening and broadcast design)
Perfectly Fit with Claudia Schiffer, CBS (Opening and broadcast design)
Dadabiz, MusiquePlus (Direction of 2 seasons x 52 episodes cultural TV show)
Gala,  MusiquePlus (Direction of Musical Video Award TV show)
Perfecto, MusiquePlus (Opening and broadcast design)
Fax, MusiquePlus (Opening and broadcast design)
Top 500 -Profil de la décennie, MusiquePlus,(Direction of documentary program)
BlackOut, (Opening and broadcast design, program structure )
BuzzClip, (Opening and broadcast design, program structure )

References 

 Jeu
 Grafika
 Infopresse
 Moment Factory
 Champ Libre
 Images
 Barrie Film Festival
 Oboro
 Promax/BDA
 Prix Gémeaux
 Cheekmagazine
 introduction (fr) given by Christian Langlois of Pierre Schoendoerffer

External links 
Mémoire liquide
Fhstudio
Industry films
Vimeo
Linkedin
The Format People
The Garden
Behance Network 
Fondation Danaé
Festival du Nouveau Cinéma
Promax/BDA

1963 births
French Quebecers
Living people
Université du Québec à Montréal alumni
Advertising directors